David Dundas may refer to:

Lord David Dundas (born 1945), pop singer of the 1970s
David Dundas (British Army officer), (1735–1820) military officer 
Sir David Dundas, 1st Baronet (1749–1826), distinguished surgeon
Sir David Dundas (politician) (1799–1877), politician, Solicitor General for England and Wales and UK Privy Counsellor
David Dundas, Lord Dundas (1854–1922), Scottish politician and judge